Alexander Morris (14 November 1858 – 1 April 1918) was a New Zealand cricketer. He played one first-class match for Otago in 1884/85.

See also
 List of Otago representative cricketers

References

External links
 

1858 births
1918 deaths
New Zealand cricketers
Otago cricketers
Cricketers from Dunedin